Cape Girardeau Township is one of ten townships in Cape Girardeau County, Missouri, USA.  As of the 2000 census, its population was 37,778.

History
Cape Girardeau Township was founded in 1807. The township took its name from the city of Cape Girardeau.

Geography
It contains fifteen cemeteries: County Memorial Park, Davis, Fairmon, Hitt, Hitt, Hitt, Lorimier, McGuire, Mount Auburn, Nunn, Old Hanover, Saint Marys, Salem, Shady Grove and Suedekum.

The streams of Cape La Croix Creek, Flora Creek, Juden Creek, Ramsey Branch, Randol Creek, Ranney Creek, Scism Creek and Sloan Creek run through this township.

Transportation
Cape Girardeau Township contains two airports or landing strips: Saint Francis Hospital Heliport and Southeast Missouri Hospital Heliport.

References

 USGS Geographic Names Information System (GNIS)

External links
 US-Counties.com
 City-Data.com

Townships in Cape Girardeau County, Missouri
Cape Girardeau–Jackson metropolitan area
Townships in Missouri